Bob Bryan and Mike Bryan were the defending champions, but lost in the semifinals this year.

Paul Hanley and Kevin Ullyett won in the final 6–4, 3–6, [10–8], against Jonas Björkman and Max Mirnyi.

Seeds
All seeds receive a bye into the second round.

Draw

Finals

Top half

Bottom half

External links
 Draw

2006 Stella Artois Championships